Westmeath may refer to:
County Westmeath, Ireland
Westmeath (Dáil constituency)
Westmeath (Parliament of Ireland constituency) 
Westmeath (UK Parliament constituency)
Westmeath GAA
A community in Whitewater Region, Ontario
Earl of Westmeath
, a British cargo ship built in 1893 and later Tokomaru

See also
Meath West (Dáil constituency)